HWY may refer to:

 Highway
 High Wycombe railway station in England
 HWY: An American Pastoral, a film by Jim Morrison
 Warrenton–Fauquier Airport, in Virginia, United States